Andrew "Andy" Bentley (born 13 May 1985) is a New Zealand professional rugby league footballer who plays as a  or  for Toulouse Olympique in the Betfred Championship.

He is a France and Scotland international representative forward and has previously played for the Catalans Dragons in the  Super League.

Background
Bentley was born in New Zealand. Born to a New Zealand/Samoan father and New Zealand Maori/Scottish mother in Auckland, Bentley moved to France at a young age where his father played for La Réole XIII.

He is the older brother of fellow Scotland, and French international, Kane Bentley.

Representative career
Bentley represented France at junior level for a number of years.

He was named in the France training squad for the 2008 Rugby League World Cup but did not make the final squad.
Andrew represented France in 2009 4 nations (England, France, New Zealand and Australia)
He represented France in the 2010 Alitalia European Cup. Bentley represented France in the 2013 Rugby League World Cup with his brother Kane.

References

External links

Toulouse Olympique profile

(archived by web.archive.org) Super League profile
Rugby League Project stats
Lezignan profile
2017 RLWC profile

1985 births
Living people
Black British sportsmen
Catalans Dragons players
France national rugby league team players
French people of Samoan descent
French people of Scottish descent
French rugby league players
Lézignan Sangliers players
New Zealand emigrants to France
New Zealand rugby league players
New Zealand people of Scottish descent
New Zealand sportspeople of Samoan descent
Oxford Rugby League players
Rugby league second-rows
Rugby league players from Auckland
Scotland national rugby league team players
Toulouse Olympique players